There are two Belarusian Wikipedias (Taraškievica: Беларуская Вікіпэдыя): one in the orthography of the Belarusian language which is official in modern Belarus (Narkamaŭka,  prefix "be:"), and another one in the pre-reform of 1933, classical orthography (Taraškievica, prefix "be-tarask:", formerly "be-x-old:").

As of March 2014, the most popular editions of Wikipedia within Belarus are the Russian Wikipedia (with 84.0% of all page views) followed by the English Wikipedia (10.2%). The Belarusian Wikipedia has much fewer page views, because of the Russification of Belarus.

History 
The first Belarusian Wikipedia was started on August 12, 2004. One of its creators and  first administrators was Uladzimir Katkouski (user name: rydel). Katkouski/rydel (who died in 2007) created over 1,300 articles in the Belarusian Wikipedia alone.

Articles in the Belarusian Wikipedia were inconsistently written in both variants of the orthography, leading to conflicts between the adherents of the two.

A "clean" version in the official orthography was initiated in the Wikipedias "incubator" at Wikimedia's Meta-Wiki. The application for a new Wikipedia was approved in March 2007.

Upon approval, in the evening of the same day, over 6,000 articles written in the pre-reform orthography were transferred from the "be.wikipedia.org" domain to "be-x-old.wikipedia.org", while the 3,500 pages from "Incubator" were moved to "be.wikipedia.org". However, due to a software bug, the move did not go smoothly: in the morning the articles seemed to have disappeared, and users could not log in. This led to a number of news reports that articles in old Belarusian orthography were deleted from Wikipedia.

In September 2015, the domain name of the classical orthography Belarusian Wikipedias was changed from be-x-old.wikipedia.org to be-tarask.wikipedia.org, reflecting the official language subtag assigned by the Internet Assigned Numbers Authority in 2007.

Including the time in the "incubator", the current variant of be-Wikipedia has existed since August 2006.

According to the Belarusian Wikipedian Volha Sitnik, the separation of the two Wikipedias wasn't very calm at first. However, as of 2023, the communities of the two Wikipedias in Belarusian language are having good relations and cooperate each other.

Rates of contributions 
Initially the official Belarusian Wikipedia overtook the classical one, but in about a year, it slowed down, and in fall 2008, the classical one was ahead. Today, the official Belarusian Wikipedia has again surpassed the one in the classical orthography.

On March 15, 2008, the official Belarusian encyclopedia reached 10,000 articles.

On June 17, 2009, the classical Belarusian encyclopedia reached 20,000 articles, holding the 65th place among other Wikipedias. At that time, the official Belarusian Wikipedia had about 16,000 articles, holding the 71st place.

On November 16, 2010, the official Belarusian encyclopedia reached 25,000 articles.

In August 2015, the official Belarusian encyclopedia reached 100,000 articles.

References

External links 

  Belarusian Wikipedia in the official orthography
 (Belarusian (Taraškievica orthography)) Belarusian Wikipedia in Taraškievica orthography
  Belarusian Wikipedia in the official orthography mobile version (homepage not yet configured)
 (Belarusian (Taraškievica orthography)) Belarusian Wikipedia in Taraškievica orthography mobile version (not fully supported)
Statistics for the normative Belarusian Wikipedia
Statistics for the classical Belarusian Wikipedia

Wikipedias by language
Wikipedia
Wikipedia
Internet properties established in 2004